James Harney (21 October 1905 – 16 October 1975) was an Irish hurler who played as a left corner-forward for club side Thurles Sarsfields and at inter-county level with the Tipperary senior hurling team.

Honours

Thurles Sarsfields
Tipperary Senior Hurling Championship (1): 1929

Tipperary
All-Ireland Senior Hurling Championship (1): 1930
Munster Senior Hurling Championship (1): 1930

References

1905 births
1975 deaths
Thurles Sarsfields hurlers
Tipperary inter-county hurlers